Duck confit is a French dish made with whole duck. In  Gascony, according to the families perpetuating the tradition of duck confit, all the pieces of duck are used to produce the meal. Each part can have a specific destination in traditional cooking, the neck being used for example in an invigorating soup, the garbure. Duck confit is considered one of the finest French dishes.

Traditional preparation 
While it is made across France, it is seen as a specialty of Gascony. The confit is prepared in a centuries-old process of preservation that consists of salt curing a piece of meat (generally goose, duck, or pork) and then cooking it in its own fat.

To prepare a confit, the meat is rubbed with salt, garlic, and sometimes herbs such as thyme, then covered and refrigerated for up to 36 hours. Salt-curing the meat acts as a preservative.

Prior to cooking, the spices are rinsed from the meat, which is then patted dry. The meat is placed in a cooking dish deep enough to contain the meat and the rendered fat, and placed in an oven at a low temperature (76 – 135 degrees Celsius/170 – 275 Fahrenheit). The meat is slowly poached at least until cooked, or until meltingly tender, generally four to ten hours.

The meat and fat are then removed from the oven and left to cool. When cool, the meat can be transferred to a canning jar or other container and completely submerged in the fat. A sealed jar of duck confit may be kept in the refrigerator for up to six months, or several weeks if kept in a reusable plastic container. To maximize preservation if canning, the fat should top the meat by at least one inch. The cooking fat acts as both a seal and preservative and results in a very rich taste. Skipping the salt curing stage greatly reduces the shelf life of the confit.

Confit is also sold in cans, which can be kept for several years. The flavourful fat from the confit may also be used in many other ways, as a frying medium for sautéed vegetables (e.g., green beans and garlic, wild or cultivated mushrooms), savory toasts, scrambled eggs or omelettes, and as an addition to shortcrust pastry for tarts and quiches.

A classic recipe is to fry or grill the legs in a bit of the fat until they are well-browned and crisp, and use more of the fat to roast some potatoes and garlic as an accompaniment.
The potatoes roasted in duck fat to accompany the crisped-up confit is called pommes de terre à la sarladaise. Another accompaniment is red cabbage slow-braised with apples and red wine.

Use in other dishes
Duck confit is also a traditional ingredient in many versions of cassoulet.

See also
 List of duck dishes

References

External links

 Three-in-One Recipe: How to Render Duck Fat, Create Duck Rinds, and Make Duck Confit (with pics)
Duck Confit Part 1 Prep and Roast 

French cuisine
Duck dishes